María Dolores de Aycinena y Micheo (29 October 1814 – 29 May 1874) was a Guatemalan woman. She was the wife of Acting President Pedro de Aycinena y Piñol, First Lady of Guatemala during his government in 1865. She was daughter of José Aycinena Carrillo and Mariana Micheo Delgado Nájera. She died in 1874, subsequently Aycinena died in 1897.

References

1814 births
1874 deaths
First ladies of Guatemala